Nam Wai is a village in the Hebe Haven area of Sai Kung District, Hong Kong.

Administration
Nam Wai is a recognized village under the New Territories Small House Policy.

History
Nam Wai is a village of the Shing and Yau clans, established during the 18th century. It appears on the "Map of the San-On District", published in 1866 by Simeone Volonteri.

See also
 Hiram's Highway
 Pak Wai, Sai Kung District

References

External links

 Delineation of area of existing village Nam Wai (Sai Kung) for election of resident representative (2019 to 2022)

Villages in Sai Kung District, Hong Kong